Miss America 1936, the tenth Miss America pageant, was held at the Steel Pier in Atlantic City, New Jersey on Saturday, September 12, 1936. Despite winning three of the pageant's contests ("most beautiful girl in evening gown", "most perfect model", and "Miss Outdoors Girl"), Miss Cook County was awarded 3rd runner-up. Miss Connecticut, the 2nd runner-up, won the "Miss Personality" prize, while Miss Philadelphia, Rose Veronica Coyle, sang and tap danced her way to the "Talent Award", as well as winning the coveted crown. Entrants from Pennsylvania took the top honor as well as capturing three other positions in the Top 15.

Results

Awards

Preliminary awards

Contestants

References

Secondary sources

External links
 Miss America official website

1936
1936 in the United States
1936 in New Jersey
September 1936 events
Events in Atlantic City, New Jersey